Magyar Jelen (Hungarian: Hungarian Present) was a radical nationalist biweekly newspaper published in Budapest, Hungary, between 2003 and 2013.

Profile
In 2003 László Toroczkai became the editor of the paper.

Magyar Jelen had a radical nationalist and an anti-Semitic stance. Its editor, Toroczkai, published articles in the paper arguing that the Romani and African populations are threats to Hungary.

The online version of Magyar Jelen was restarted in August 2020, after a relative of the owner of the Elemi.hu news portal terminated the access rights of the employees connected to the Our Homeland Movement. László Toroczkai notified the newsletter recipients about this on 25 August 2020. The recipients also learned from a newsletter on 28 August 2020 that the Internet version of Magyar Jelen was launched, which follows the spirit of the Our Homeland Movement. According to the imprint of the online Magyar Jelen, the publisher is the Innovative Communication Foundation, which is based in Ásotthalom.

See also
 List of newspapers in Hungary

References

External links
Magyar Jelen website

2003 establishments in Hungary
2013 disestablishments in Hungary
Biweekly newspapers
Defunct newspapers published in Hungary
Far-right politics in Hungary
Hungarian-language newspapers
Newspapers published in Budapest
Publications established in 2003
Publications disestablished in 2013
Online newspapers with defunct print editions